Marcin Polak (born 25 November 1982) is Polish Paralympic cyclist. He represented Poland at the 2016 Summer Paralympics and 2020 Summer Paralympics.

Career
On 31 January 2020, Polak set the world record in the 4 km individual pursuit in the B classification with a time of 4 minutes 3.528 seconds.

He won a bronze medal in the men's individual pursuit B event at the 2020 Summer Paralympics.

References 

Living people
1982 births
Cyclists at the 2016 Summer Paralympics
Cyclists at the 2020 Summer Paralympics
Medalists at the 2020 Summer Paralympics
Paralympic bronze medalists for Poland
Paralympic medalists in cycling
Paralympic cyclists of Poland
UCI Para-cycling World Champions
21st-century Polish people